Kezi may refer to:
 Kezi, Iran
 Kezi, Zimbabwe

See also
 KEZI, a television station in Eugene, Oregon, USA